Lāsma is a Latvian feminine given name. Its name day is October 1.

Notable people named Lāsma 
Lāsma Kauniste (born 1942), Latvian speed skater
Lāsma Kugrēna (born 1952), Latvian actress
Lāsma Liepa (born 1988), Latvian-born Turkish sprint kayaker 
Lāsma Zemene (born 1990), Latvian Miss World contestant

References 

Latvian feminine given names
Feminine given names